The Auckland Airport Line was a proposed heavy rail line in Auckland, New Zealand, that would have linked Auckland Airport with the Auckland central business district via central isthmus suburbs.

As of 2022, the plan is to implement the connection via a new light rail line.

History 
The main barrier to a rail link was the crossing of the Manukau Harbour between Onehunga and the suburb Māngere Bridge. Transit New Zealand announced in 2007 that a new motorway bridge duplicating, and alongside, the existing 1983 Māngere Bridge would be designed to accommodate a rail link. In September 2007, Auckland Regional Transport Authority announced that it was willing to pay Transit $2.5 million to "future-proof" the duplication of the bridge in order "to accommodate a passenger rail connection".

The duplication of the bridge was completed in 2010. The new bridge can technically accommodate a rail link, however this is a curved, single-track alignment with a design speed of 20 km/h. The successor to Transit New Zealand, NZ Transport Agency, provided for a rail corridor near the motorway as far as Walmsley Road. The proposed heavy rail line was the most popular with the public of the three Auckland rail proposals of Mayor Len Brown, although the number of trains would be limited without the City Rail Link to Britomart Transport Centre. Brown had promised a rail link to the Airport during his 2010 election campaign as part of a package of measures to double public transport patronage within 15 years.

The official name for the airport link in the Long-term Plan 2012–2022 is the South Western Airport Multi Modal Corridor Project.

The Airport rail link planning study commenced in 2010.

The Auckland Airport company asked for a decision by mid-2016 whether a rail or bus station would be needed at the airport, as it was planning a new domestic terminal, with construction to start in 2021.

Escalating costs (estimated at $1.63b) for the heavy rail line to the Airport prompted some to raise the possibility of the route being served by light rail between Onehunga and the airport as an alternative to heavy rail. This option would make use of existing infrastructure where possible to reduce expenses and would involve an interchange with the existing heavy rail services at Onehunga.

The line was initially conceived as an extension of the Onehunga Branch line over the Māngere Bridge and via the suburbs of Māngere Bridge and Māngere. However the 2016 study identified this as an expensive option:
the need to double-track the branch line for high train frequencies
the high cost of grade-separating and closing level crossings on the branch line versus the less expensive but much less safe option of no grade-separation with barriers and pedestrian gates
the extent of viaducts and tunnelling required for an underground terminus under the airport terminal, with a decision needing to be made in time for the airport to begin construction of a new domestic terminal

These made an extension of Auckland's heavy rail network an expensive option. This heavy rail option would add three new stations (at Māngere Bridge, Māngere and the airport terminal) and require airport trains to run via the already-congested tracks and junctions of the inner Southern Line.

The heavy rail option would result in a journey time of 39 minutes from the airport to Britomart Transport Centre in Auckland CBD, at an estimated cost of NZ$2.2 billion.

Light rail

The choice of mode and alignment for the Airport Line remained contentious. In the 2017 general election campaign, promises of light rail to the airport were made by the Labour Party, which established the Sixth Labour Government with a coalition agreement. One coalition partner, the Green Party, also favoured light rail although the other partner, New Zealand First, favoured the earlier heavy rail scheme. The previous (National Party) government said that light rail would be eventually required, but would not happen for thirty years.

On 28 January 2022, Transport Minister Michael Wood announced that the New Zealand Government has approved a NZ$14.6 billion project to establish a partially tunnelled light rail network between Auckland Airport and the Wynyard Quarter via the Auckland CBD. While the Green Party's Ricardo Menéndez welcomed the planned rail link, the ACT Party's transport spokesperson Simon Court claimed the project would be wasteful in terms of tax revenue.

References

Proposed railway lines in New Zealand
Public transport in Auckland
Rail transport in Auckland
Cancelled airport rail links
History of Auckland